Bass Masters Classic: Pro Edition is an enhanced version of the Bass Masters Classic fishing video game. This game was released for both the Super Nintendo Entertainment System and the Sega Genesis video game devices.

As a promotional tool, an introductory offer to join the Bass Anglers Sportsman Society for $14 (instead of the usual $20) was bundled with the game.

Gameplay

The game contains real companies in the fishing industry (i.e. Ranger Boats, Evinrude Outboard Motors, etc.) The game has two modes where the player fishes as an amateur and competes against other amateurs. The player also has the option of playing as famous bass anglers such as Tom Mann Jr. and Hank Parker.

Once the player has selected a mode they purchase various lures, rods, motors, depth sounders and other fishing implements. From here the player can practice skill in the practice pond or begin fishing in their first tournament. While there are a few different lakes that can be unlocked the gameplay remains the same. The player begins by driving their boat to a spot on the lake. There they cast and the screen switches from overhead view to an underwater camera.

The player then entices the fish into biting their lure and a fight ensues.

Ports
The title Bass Masters Classic was also ported to Game Boy Color.

Reception

On release, Famicom Tsūshin scored the Super Famicom version of the game a 22 out of 40.

Scary Larry of GamePro gave the Genesis version of the original Bass Masters Classic a negative review. Though he noted it has a larger selection of anglers than the SNES version does, he criticized the "murky" graphics and sound, and said of the gameplay that "real fishing is easier than this. The Fish Finder is inaccurate, the casting can be ridiculously off-course, and there are long boring stretches while you wait for bass to come around."

GamePros Bro' Buzz gave the Super NES version a more positive review, saying it "won't win new fans to the sport, [but] hard-core video fisherpersons will be hooked." He particularly praised the fun fishing and new underwater view.

Next Generation reviewed the Genesis version of the game, rating it three stars out of five, and stated that "Basically, this game is loaded with extras and so patient gamers may even enjoy the slow paced sim fishing. Still, for the most part, Bass Masters Classic is strictly for fishing fanatics."

References

1996 video games
Black Pearl Software games
Fishing video games
Malibu Interactive games
Sega Genesis games
Single-player video games
Super Nintendo Entertainment System games
THQ games
Top-down video games
Video games developed in the United States